Polia piniae, the piney moth, is a species of cutworm or dart moth in the family Noctuidae. It is found in North America.

The MONA or Hodges number for Polia piniae is 10274.

References

Further reading

 
 
 

Hadenini
Articles created by Qbugbot
Moths described in 1967